Ōmae, Omae, Oomae or Ohmae (written: 大前) is a Japanese surname. Notable people with the surname include:

, Japanese fiction writer
, Japanese voice actress
, Japanese tennis player
, Japanese footballer
, Japanese business theorist and writer
, Japanese politician
, Japanese naval officer and author

Japanese-language surnames